The Gentiloni government was the 64th government of the Italian Republic, in office from 12 December 2016 to 1 June 2018. The government was headed by Paolo Gentiloni, former Minister of Foreign Affairs of the Renzi government.

The government was formed after Matteo Renzi's resignation as Prime Minister, due to the result of the 2016 constitutional referendum. The new government preserved most of the ministers of the former Renzi government. It was led by the centre-left Democratic Party (PD), and it originally included the New Centre-Right (NCD) and the Centrists for Europe (CpE) as junior partners. It also included a few non-party independents. The NCD was later merged into Popular Alternative (AP).

History

Background and formation

On 7 December 2016, Prime Minister Matteo Renzi announced his resignation, following the rejection of his proposals to overhaul the Senate in the 2016 constitutional referendum. A few days later, on 11 December 2016, President Sergio Mattarella asked Paolo Gentiloni, then Minister of Foreign Affairs, to form a new government. On the following day Gentiloni was officially sworn in as the new head of the government.

Gentiloni formed a coalition government supported by his own Democratic Party, the New Centre-Right and the Centrists for Italy. This was the same majority which supported Renzi's government for almost three years. The centrist Liberal Popular Alliance, led by Denis Verdini, did not support the new government, because no party member was appointed minister. Deputy ministers of the Italian Socialist Party and Solidary Democracy were also appointed. After the split of the Democratic and Progressive Movement from the Democratic Party, that party was presented by one deputy minister in the government until 3 October 2017.

Investiture votes

Party breakdown

Beginning of term

Ministers

Ministers and other members
 Democratic Party (PD): Prime minister, 12 ministers, 3 deputy ministers, 16 undersecretaries
 New Centre-Right (NCD): 3 ministers, 1 deputy minister, 10 undersecretaries
 Centrists for Europe (CpE): 1 minister
 Solidary Democracy (Demo.S): 2 deputy ministers
 Italian Socialist Party (PSI): 1 deputy minister
 Democratic Centre (CD): 1 undersecretary
 Civics and Innovators (CI): 1 undersecretary
 Independents: 2 ministers, 4 undersecretaries

End of term

Ministers

Ministers and other members
 Democratic Party (PD): Prime minister, 13 ministers, 2 deputy ministers, 16 undersecretaries
 Popular Alternative (AP): 2 ministers, 1 deputy minister, 8 undersecretaries
 Centrists for Europe (CpE): 1 minister
 Solidary Democracy (DemoS): 2 deputy ministers
 Italian Socialist Party (PSI): 1 deputy minister
 Independents: 3 undersecretaries
 Democratic Centre (CD): 1 undersecretary
 Civics and Innovators (CI): 1 undersecretary
 Forza Europa (FE): 1 undersecretary

Geographical breakdown

Beginning of term
 Northern Italy: 9 ministers
 Emilia-Romagna: 4 ministers
 Lombardy: 2 ministers
 Liguria: 2 ministers
 Piedmont: 1 minister
 Central Italy: 7 ministers (incl. Gentiloni)
 Lazio: 6 ministers
 Tuscany: 1 minister
 Southern and Insular Italy: 3 ministers
 Sicily: 2 ministers
 Calabria: 1 minister

End of term
 Northern Italy: 7 ministers
 Emilia-Romagna: 4 ministers
 Liguria: 2 ministers
 Lombardy: 1 minister
 Central Italy: 7 ministers (incl. Gentiloni)
 Lazio: 6 ministers
 Tuscany: 1 minister
 Southern and Insular Italy: 3 ministers
 Sicily: 2 ministers
 Calabria: 1 minister

Council of Ministers

Composition

References

External links 

2016 establishments in Italy
Italian governments
Renzi Cabinet
Cabinets established in 2016